Tyler Reed Hubbard (born January 31, 1987) is an American singer-songwriter, and musician, best known as a former member of the Nashville-based duo Florida Georgia Line. After that duo went on hiatus in 2021, Hubbard began recording as a solo artist on EMI Nashville. His first solo chart entry was a guest vocalist on Tim McGraw's "Undivided", followed by his first solo single "5 Foot 9", which topped the Billboard Country Airplay charts in 2022.

Early life
Hubbard was born on January 31, 1987, in Monroe, Georgia, and is the oldest of three children born to Roy (died 2007) and Amy Hubbard. He spent much of his time on dirt bikes or playing whatever sport was in season. He was very involved at church and would attend multiple times a week.  By the time he was in high school, he was leading the worship service at church and spending his free time making hip-hop/rap beats with his friends and learning to play the guitar. Hubbard graduated from high school at Loganville Christian Academy in 2005 and went on to study at Belmont University.  In 2007, Hubbard's father was killed in a helicopter accident near his hometown.

Career

Florida Georgia Line (2010- present)
Hubbard was introduced to Brian Kelley at Belmont University in 2007 by a mutual friend in a campus worship group. The two became great friends, and began writing songs and playing guitar together. The two began playing writers rounds throughout Nashville, as well as selling out shows at local venues. In 2009, the duo decided they wanted to pursue music as a career and they started playing shows throughout the south. In 2010, they recorded and digitally distributed their first EP, Anything Like Me. Shortly after they were discovered at a county fair by Nickelback's producer, Joey Moi. After writing and polishing songs for two years, the duo released their second EP It'z Just What We Do in 2012. Major labels became interested when their debut single, "Cruise", first hit satellite radio on "The Highway" channel and began selling well on iTunes, leading to a deal with Republic Nashville and the Big Machine Label Group.

In the fall of 2011, Hubbard signed a publishing deal with Big Loud Shirt.

The duo released their first studio album, Here's to the Good Times, on December 4, 2012, with Republic Nashville. The album was the sixth best selling album of 2013.  "Cruise", the first single on the album, reached number 1 on the Country Airplay chart dated December 15, 2012. A remix of "Cruise" featuring Nelly later hit number 4 on the Billboard Hot 100. The song is also the best selling country digital song of all time, with sales of over 10 million, and it spent 24 weeks at number 1 on Hot Country songs. The other singles from this album include "Get Your Shine On", "Round Here", "Stay", and "This Is How We Roll".

In February 2014, Hubbard sustained a back injury in a dirt bike accident.

Florida Georgia Line's second studio album, Anything Goes, was released on October 14, 2014. The album's first single, "Dirt", was released on July 8, 2014. Other singles from this album include "Sun Daze", "Sippin' On Fire", "Anything Goes" and "Confession".

The duo's third album, Dig Your Roots, was released on August 26, 2016. Singles include "H.O.L.Y.", "May We All", "God, Your Mama, and Me" and "Smooth".

They released their fourth studio album, Can't Say I Ain't Country, on February 15, 2019. Singles include "Simple", "Talk You Out of It" and "Blessings".

On February 12, 2021, they released their fifth studio album, Life Rolls On, which was co-produced by the duo alongside Corey Crowder. It includes the singles "I Love My Country" and "Long Live".

Tree Vibez Music and Round Here Records (2015–present)
In 2015, Hubbard and Kelley started their own artist development and music publishing company called Tree Vibez Music. Since the company began, they have signed writer Jordan Schmidt, writer Jimmie Deeghan, writer/artist Drew Castle as well as singer-songwriters Canaan Smith and RaeLynn. In 2019, Hubbard and Kelley launched Round Here Records; an independent label with Smith signed as the flagship artist.

Solo career (2021–present)
Since 2021, Hubbard’s bandmate Brian Kelley signalled an intention to record and release solo music while remaining a part of Florida Georgia Line, with the support of Hubbard. Simultaneously, Hubbard revealed he would occasionally record collaborations as a solo artist as well. The first of these, the single "Undivided" with Tim McGraw, was released on January 13, 2021. He then featured on the song "My Way" with rapper Lathan Warlick. Hubbard and Russell Dickerson were both featured on Thomas Rhett's 2022 promotional single "Death Row".

Hubbard signed a recording contract with EMI Nashville in May 2022 and plans to release a solo album on the label. He released his debut solo single "5 Foot 9" later that month. On November 4, 2022, Hubbard announced that his debut album would be released on January 27, 2023. He co-headlined the halftime show at the 109th Grey Cup in Regina, Saskatchewan alongside Jordan Davis and Josh Ross.

Personal life
Hubbard and Hayley Stommel began dating in 2013. On September 22, 2014, Hubbard proposed during a helicopter flight. They were married in Idaho on July 1, 2015. The couple have two sons and one daughter.

Discography

Studio albums

Extended plays

Singles

Promotional singles

Other charted songs

Guest appearances

Songwriting
Commercially released songs recorded by other artists.

References

External links
 

1987 births
21st-century American singers
American country singer-songwriters
Country musicians from Georgia (U.S. state)
American male singer-songwriters
Living people
Florida Georgia Line members
21st-century American male singers
Singer-songwriters from Georgia (U.S. state)